The 1991 Colonial Athletic Association baseball tournament was held at Harrington Field on the campus of East Carolina in Greenville, North Carolina, from May 14 through 17.  The event determined the champion of the Colonial Athletic Association for the 1991 season.  Third-seeded  won the tournament for the fourth time, and third in a row, and earned the CAA's automatic bid to the 1991 NCAA Division I baseball tournament.

Entering the event, East Carolina had won the most championships, with three, including the previous two.  George Mason and Richmond had each won once.

Format and seeding
The CAA's six teams were seeded one to six based on winning percentage from the conference's round robin regular season.  They played a double-elimination tournament with first round matchups of the top and bottom seeds, second and fifth seeds, and third and fourth seeds.

Bracket and results

Most Valuable Player
David Leisten was named Tournament Most Valuable Player.  Leisten was an outfielder for East Carolina.

References

Tournament
Colonial Athletic Association Baseball Tournament
Colonial Athletic Association baseball tournament
Colonial Athletic Association baseball tournament
Baseball in North Carolina
College sports in North Carolina
Greenville, North Carolina
Sports competitions in North Carolina
Tourist attractions in Pitt County, North Carolina